Darlington College is a further education college in Darlington, County Durham, England. The college campus is located at Central Park, Haughton Road. With support from Darlington Borough Council and Tees Valley Regeneration the college building was constructed by Shepherd Construction, starting in 2004.
Founded in 1897, it assumed its present form in September 2006 and was officially opened by the then-Prime Minister, Tony Blair, on 22 December 2006.

Teaching 

The college offers a wide range of vocational courses from Hair and Beauty to Construction Services.
The University Centre unites the further and higher education of Darlington College with that of Queen Elizabeth Sixth Form College and the University of Teesside.

College facilities 

Darlington College offers a learning and training environment which includes: a university centre; 'business first' - bespoke training for employers; a well equipped computing and networking suite; sports facilities; media design centre; restaurant and food court; hair and Beauty salons. The restaurant and hair and beauty salons are open to the public.

History as Technical College 

The college was originally named "Darlington Technical College", which was constructed in 1897 designed by George Gordon Hoskins. It opened in October 1897.
It was built by the Borough of Darlington next to North Lodge Park "to help continue the efficiency of manufacturing and commerce".

By the 1950s the college used 28 buildings around Darlington and in 1955 took over the Girls High School building in Cleveland Avenue. New blocks were opened in 1957, and between 1963 and 1972 further development concentrated education on a single site. Darlington College of Education was also part of the institution's offerings, but closed in 1978. However, later associations with institutions of higher learning now provide for teacher training.

Darlington College of Technology re-branded in 2006 when it moved to its new site situated on Haughton Road. It became known as Darlington College, the name it still uses today.

Notable alumni
Luke Armstrong, professional footballer who qualified as a personal trainer at the college 
Alex Cunningham, Member of Parliament for Stockton North (2010 -)
Carol Malia, BBC Look North presenter
Pauline Murray, lead singer of the band Penetration
Christopher Mark Pattinson, Great Britain and England International Swimmer 
John Sergeant, journalist and former Chief Political Correspondent for the BBC

References

External links 

 

Further education colleges in County Durham
College
Darlington